The Our Lady of Guidance is a 16th-century image of the Blessed Virgin Mary depicted as the Immaculate Conception and widely venerated by Filipinos. The wooden Black Madonna is considered the oldest extant Marian statue in the Philippines.

Locally venerated as patroness of navigators and travelers, the image is enshrined at the Ermita Church in the city of Manila.

Due to its fragility and value, the original Marian image does not leave the premises of its inner sanctum except when the pontiff visits the country. A modern proxy image (called “Vicaria”) is used for exposed church services instead.

Description 

Made of indigenous molave (Vitex cofassus) wood, the statue stands about  an is characterized by dark skin, Asiatic features, and long brunette hair. It is often dressed in both a manto and a stylized tapis, the indigenous wraparound skirt of Filipino women.

Among her regalia are a sceptre, a parure of jewels offered by Archbishop of Manila Rufino J. Cardinal Santos in 1960, and a gold crown bestowed by Pope Paul VI during his visit to Manila Cathedral on 16 May 1971.

History 

According to the Anales de la Catedral de Manila, the crew of Miguel López de Legazpi discovered a group of natives in what is now Ermita along the eastern shores of Manila Bay worshiping a statue of a female figure. There are several theories of its origin, as an Animist-Tantrist Diwata, an East Asian statue due to her Chinese features, a Marian icon imported from nearby Portuguese Macau, or, due to its striking resemblance to the Santo Niño de Cebu, a relic of the 1521 Magellan expedition. This sacred statue had managed to survive the Islamic iconoclasm by the Sultanate of Brunei (نڬارا بروني دارالسلام), a state that had invaded and colonised Manila.

While its original purpose is debated, the image was later identified by missionaries as the Virgin Mary. Local folklore recounts the Spaniards witnessing natives venerating the statue in a "pagan manner", by placing it on a trunk surrounded by pandan plants. The pandan is a common food ingredient in the Indianised cultures of South and Southeast Asia to which it is endemic. The manner of worship of this Catholic icon is remembered in the placement of pandan leaves, real or imitation, surrounding the andas as one of its attributes.

On 19 May 1571, the local sovereigns Sulayman III and Rajah Matanda ceded Kota Selurong (a client state of the Sultanate of Brunei) as well as the Kingdom of Tondo, to the Spanish Empire, with Miguel López de Legazpi, who had arrived from Mexico, consecrating the city to both Saint Pudentiana and Our Lady of Guidance. In 1578, Philip II of Spain issued a royal decree invoking Our Lady of Guidance to be "sworn patroness" of Manila. The statue was first enshrined in Manila Cathedral inside the citadel of Intramuros until 1606, when the first shrine compound was built on the current site. Called La Hermita ("the Hermitage") because of a Mexican hermit who lived in the area, the shrine was originally made of bamboo, nipa, and molave wood. It was later rebuilt in stone but suffered damaged in an earthquake in 1810. The icon was first revered under the title of the Immaculate Conception, however, the Spanish explorers who first discovered her, together with the native Filipinos who witnessed their wishes and supplications granted before the icon, considered her as their mutual guide. When the image was later moved to Ermita shrine from Intramuros, the tower of the Ermita shrine emitted light at night or during storms. This light guided traveling ships and sailors in the darkness, and people named the icon "Our Lady of Guidance".

In 1897, a novena booklet titled Novena o Pagsisiam sa Nuestra Señora de Guia ("Novena to Our Lady of Guidance") was published by the Pontifical and Royal University of Santo Tomas in Manila. The text recounts the image's origin story, where natives found it sitting on a trunk, and built a roof above it, and the surrounding pandan plants. The text goes on to condemn them for their polytheism, and mentions murder. The image initially had a feast day on 18 December, but the date was transferred to 19 May when a rainstorm struck Manila Cathedral in February 1771.

During the Second World War, the statue was saved by the parish priest of Ermita Church, Fr. Blas de Guernica, and a Justo N. López. They hid the statue in a niche of the church's crypt a few weeks before the Allies liberated Manila in February 1945. After the battle, Fr. Rogelio Bedonia, along with a chaplain and four soldiers of the United States Army, went to the obliterated shrine, retrieved the icon, and brought it to a safer place. Until the construction of a temporary chapel, the icon stayed in a private house on Taft Avenue, in San Miguel de Mayumo and finally in Quiapo. The current shrine was built in 1947.

A replica of the image was made to commemorate the quadricentennial of the icon's finding. From May 1970 to 1971, the replica visited almost all parishes, chapels, hospitals, schools, and other institutions in the Archdiocese of Manila. It is this replica that is brought out for processions and public veneration on its feast day, with the original remaining ensconced in its glass-covered alcove above the main altar. The statue was removed from the shrine and placed in the room of Pope John Paul II for the duration of his 1995 Apostolic visit.

In December 2011, EWTN featured the statue as the "oldest Marian Icon in the Philippines" in the program, "Mary: Mother of the Philippines". Father Patrick Peyton also once preached a sermon on the Family Rosary Crusade in the presence of the image.

Coronation
The Marian image was episcopally crowned on Rizal Day, 30 December 1955 by the Apostolic Nuncio to the Philippines, Archbishop Egidio Vagnozzi.

The statue was removed from the shrine and placed in the room of Pope John Paul II for the duration of his visit in early January 1995 for World Youth Day.

On 14 January 2015, the image was again removed from Ermita Church and translated to the Apostolic Nunciature along Taft Avenue, where Pope Francis stayed during his visit to the Philippines and Sri Lanka. The icon was later present at Quirino Grandstand for the Pope's open-air Mass on 18 January.

Archdiocesan shrine
The church was granted archdiocesan shrine status in 2005 under former Archbishop of Manila Cardinal Gaudencio Rosales. The current parish priest and rector is the Reverend Monsignor Mario David Enríquez, who was installed on 16 July 2015.

Patronage
Due to the church's proximity to the United States Embassy, the statue is often visited by locals who petition the Virgin for safety in overseas travel. Devotees claim that when invoked under this title, the Virgin's intercession is speedy and miraculous, particularly in securing approval of requests for United States visas.

She is also considered the patroness of all Overseas Filipino Workers.

See also
Catholic Church in the Philippines
Iná Poón Bató
Manila Cathedral
Our Lady of Peace and Good Voyage
Santo Niño de Cebú

References

http://www.rcam.org/news/2005/ermita_church_declared_archdiocesan_shrine.htm
http://www.hmdb.org/marker.asp?marker=25094
http://www.manilacathedral.org/History/history.htm
https://archive.org/stream/novenapagsisiam00librgoog#page/n1/mode/2up Novena o Pagsisyam sa Nuestra Senora de Guia, 1897
https://web.archive.org/web/20110427204752/http://www.rcam.org/parishes/page_detail_parishes/A/archdiocesan_shrine_of_nuestra_senora_de_guia.htm

External links

 Shrine of Our Lady of Guidance

Roman Catholic Church in Metro Manila
Statues of the Virgin Mary
Titles of Mary
Marian devotions
Shrines to the Virgin Mary